Contraband Spain is a 1955 crime film written and directed by Lawrence Huntington and starring Richard Greene, Anouk Aimée and Michael Denison. Its Spanish title is Contrabando.

Plot
A United States Department of the Treasury agent works against smugglers on the border between Spain and France. He has a personal interest as his brother who was part of the gang was murdered by them.  The gang smuggles watches into Spain and brings counterfeit American money into England that is used to buy gold that is melted down and shipped to Continental Europe.

Cast

 Richard Greene as Lee Scott 
 Anouk Aimée as Elena Vargas 
 Michael Denison as Ricky Metcalfe 
 José Nieto as Pierre
 Robert Ayres as Mr. Dean
 Richard Warner as Inspector LeGrand
 John Warwick as Bryant
 Philip Saville as Martin Scott 
 Alfonso Estela as Henchman 
 Conrado San Martín as Henchman 
 Antonio Almorós as Lucien Remue
 G. H. Mulcaster as Colonel Ingleby

Christopher Lee provides uncredited narration in the film.

Locations
The film features locations in Barcelona, including La Rambla in the opening images. Later, when Richard Greene follows the villains (both travelling in taxis), they get out in Plaza Real with its arcaded pavements.

The seaside town of Blanes also appears, and there is much driving to and from the French town of Urdos over the border from Girona province.

Critical reception
TV Guide wrote, "a lot of action against beautiful continental backgrounds makes up for weaknesses in plot structure" ; while Allmovie called it a "fast-paced espionager."

References

External links

1956 films
1956 crime films
Films directed by Lawrence Huntington
Films set in Spain
British crime films
Spanish crime films
1950s English-language films
1950s British films
1950s Spanish films